JYP Entertainment Corporation is a South Korean multinational entertainment and record label conglomerate founded in 1997 by J. Y. Park. It is one of the largest entertainment companies in South Korea, and operates as a record label, talent agency, music production company, event management company, concert production company, and music publishing house. In addition, the company operates various subsidiary ventures and divisions worldwide.

Notable artists under the agency include the groups 2PM, Day6, Twice, Boy Story, Stray Kids, Itzy, NiziU, Xdinary Heroes and Nmixx.

History

1997–1999: Formation and first generation K-pop artist

JYP Entertainment was founded in 1997 by South Korean singer-songwriter Park Jin-young (named after his stage name, J. Y. Park) as Tae-Hong Planning Corporation, which eventually became JYP Entertainment in 2001. In 1997, the company signed its first artist and female solo artist, Pearl.

In 1999, entertainment company SidusHQ introduced the future members of boy band Groove Over Dose (g.o.d) to Park as their producer and mentor. In cooperation with SidusHQ, JYP oversaw the formation of g.o.d, which would make their debut appearance on January 13, 1999. While the group itself was managed by SidusHQ, their first album, Chapter 1, was produced by Park.

2000–2009: Early success and second generation K-pop artists 
In December 2000, JYP signed Rain as a trainee, who made his debut two years later in May 2002. Rain would then rise to become a commercial success throughout and beyond Asia, which was seen when his third studio album, It's Raining, went on to record cumulative sales of over 1 million copies in seven Asian countries, including Korea.

On December 27, 2002, the company's first boy group was a four-member vocal oriented group Noel, but they failed to attract popularity. JYP then turned its focus towards the duo brothers One Two in 2003. In 2004, after the boy band g.o.d.'s group contract with SidusHQ ended, they signed a contract with JYP.

Other notable artists that debuted under JYP from the years 2000 to 2005 include Park Ji-yoon, Byul, Lim Jeong-hee, Ryanga Rhanga, and Ivy.
In May 2006, JYP formed its first girl group, Wonder Girls, who became a commercial success and was the first South Korean group to enter the Billboard Hot 100 in 2009 when their song "Nobody" charted at No. 76. Their success lead to a management deal with the Jonas Group, which allowed the Wonder Girls to open the Jonas Brothers's world tour in select cities.

In 2007, Rain left JYP and established his own agency called J. Tune Entertainment, but stated that he kept his collaborative relationship with J. Y. Park.

In 2008, the competitive reality series Hot Blood Men was created, pitting two teams of male trainees against each other for the chance to debut. The winning group, One Day, was later split into two boy bands, 2PM and 2AM; both debuted that same year. 2AM was jointly contracted with Big Hit Entertainment. Later in October, JYP opened the JYP Beijing Center as their China branch. In that same year, the Creative Artists Agency (CAA) included JYP in its roster of high-profile clientele.

Expanding its endeavors into the drama production industry following in the footsteps of SM Entertainment Group's SM C&C and CJ E&M (now CJ ENM)'s Studio Dragon, JYP jointly established the TV drama production company Holym with KEYEAST Entertainment in June 2009. Holym later announced its first major TV drama production, Dream High, in 2010.

2010–2017: Joint ventures and third generation K-pop artists
In March 2010, JYP made a joint venture with SM Entertainment, YG Entertainment, Star Empire, Media Line, CAN Entertainment and Music Factory Entertainment to establish KMP Holdings, the official distributor of releases from these companies. On December 28, 2010, it was announced that JYP has become the largest shareholder of J. Tune Entertainment. The subsidiary AQ Entertainment was later formed and introduced the Chinese-Korean girl group Miss A.

In November 2011, the US-based subsidiary JYP Creative was established and it was reported that Park invested approximately US$1.2 million in the branch. However, after a year of operation, the company reportedly saw a net loss of around US$1.5 million by the end of 2012, forcing the CEO to liquidate the branch and close all US operations, including the New York branch. The same year, Park Jimin, winner of the competitive TV series K-pop Star, and Baek Yerin, a female trainee and contestant on the show Star King, debuted as the duo 15&.

In 2012, JYP Pictures signed a contract with China Eastern Performing Arts Group to co-produce a movie Hold Your Hand, featuring actors who belonged to JYP.

On June 20, 2013, the plan to merge the publicly listed JYP Entertainment (which houses artists such as 2PM, 2AM and Wonder Girls) and the non-listed JYP (which houses artists such as J. Y. Park, Sunmi, Park Ji-min, Baek Ye-rin and Lee Jung-jin) as a single company was announced. The shareholders' meeting regarding the merger was held on September 13. The meeting concluded with the approval of the merger, effective starting from October 17. Thus, artists under the non-listed JYP will become part of the post-merger JYP Entertainment. In addition, Miss A and Baek A-yeon, who had been part of the now defunct AQ Entertainment—as the result of the merger, also joined JYP Entertainment. On August 25, 2013, it was revealed that JYP and KeyEast Entertainment reached an agreement to terminate their joint production enterprise, Holym. On November 17, 2013, JYPt partnered with Smile Gate to promote the game Crossfire with 2PM and Miss A.

In January 2014, the seven talent agencies behind KMP Holdings formed a collective bond partnership and bought 13.48% of KT Music's stocks, leaving KT Corporation with only 49.99%. That same month, Got7, the label's first boy group since the debut of 2PM and 2AM in 2008, made their debut. 2AM's joint contract of Big Hit with JYP expired later that April, after which three of the 2AM members returned to JYP, while member Lee Chang-min stayed with Big Hit in order to continue with his solo career and as part of the duo Homme. In late August, JYP Pictures and Dongyang World Culture Communication produced the drama Dream Knight, starring Got7 members. Season three K-pop Star winner Bernard Park signed a contract with JYP to start his solo career, eventually making his debut on October 6, 2014. On December 17, 2014, it was reported that J.Y. Park sold the company's HQ building in Cheongdam-dong, Seoul to Choi Ki-won, the sister of SK Group's chairman Choi Tae-won, for about $7 million, on the term that JYP will still use the building for three years on rent.

The subsidiary Studio J was formed on January 9, 2015, in line with JYP's goal to "promote free and deep artists that create authentic music rather than appealing to the mainstream demand." The first artist on Studio J's roster was G. Soul, who debuted on the same day. In March 2015, it was announced that 2AM members Seulong and Jinwoon departed from JYP Entertainment because of their contract expiration, while Jo Kwon renewed his contract. Despite this development, the company stated that 2AM remained intact and will be promoting as a group in a similar set-up as that of boy band g.o.d. On April 15, JYP signed a contract with Jax Coco, a Hong Kong-based coconut product company. Under the agreement, JYP and Jax Coco planned to launch coconut oil, coconut flakes, and other related products at major department stores and supermarkets in South Korea. Two groups were formed by JYP later in 2015: the rock band Day6 which debuted on September 7, and the girl group Twice, whose members were chosen from the competitive reality show Sixteen, and debuted on October 20.

Venturing into the Chinese market, JYP established a music distribution partnership with China Music Corporation on February 19, 2016. This was followed by JYP jointly establishing Beijing Xin Sheng Entertainment Co. Ltd. with Tencent Music Entertainment in the same year, which oversaw the debut of the Chinese boy band Boy Story. Got7 member Jackson Wang later announced his solo endeavors in the country.

On July 1, 2017, JYP acquired a property worth 20.2 billion KRW (US$18 million) in Seongnae-dong, Gangdong District, Seoul to be used as its new office. A partnership with DailyMotion, Europe's largest video platform, was also signed to open its artist channel on its platform to secure a more global fan base.

2018–2020: Further success and fourth generation K-pop artists

On January 31, 2018, it was reported that JYP entered into a music business agreement with SM Entertainment, Big Hit Entertainment, and SK Telecom to launch a new music platform which will utilize various new technologies such as artificial intelligence and 5G networking. SK Telecom affiliate Iriver will be responsible for handling the music distribution of the three entertainment companies. In line with this agreement, the music platform FLO was launched. In the first half of 2018, JYP became the second largest entertainment company in South Korea when their total market capitalization surpassed YG Entertainment, largely due to the success of Twice and Got7. It was the first time that JYP had placed second among the Big 3 companies, with SM retaining the top position. 
On March 26, 2018, JYP debuted a new boy group called Stray Kids, named after the 2017 reality show of the same name. In May 2018, JYP became the only Korean entertainment company to rank in Financial Times magazine's "FT 1000: High-Growth Companies Asia-Pacific" list, charting at No. 177 out of all 1000 companies and No. 12 out of all 104 Korean companies. On August 30, 2018, it was reported that JYPE's shares closed at 31,300 KRW (US$28.20), pushing the company's market capitalization to 1.09 trillion KRW (US$980.26 million), exceeding that of SM Entertainment's 1.08 trillion KRW (US$971.27 million). With this, JYP became the largest among the Big 3 K-pop labels. On November 1, 2018, JYP launched a new program with Mnet named Super Intern, which showcased the intern process at JYP, but the main goal was to turn the interns into permanent marketing management staff for each division of artists. The show started to air on Mnet TV on January 24, 2019.

On January 21, 2019, JYP announced they would be debuting a new girl group named Itzy. On the same day, the group's official YouTube account was created and the label's official channel shared a video trailer unveiling the five members. On February 12, the group released their debut single album, It'z Different, with its lead single "Dalla Dalla". On January 29, 2019, JYP announced their plans of creating a Japanese girl group, under their vision "JYP 2.0: Globalization By Localization". Auditions for this new girl group took place in 8 Japanese cities, Hawaii, and Los Angeles, for females aged between 15 and 22 years old. This project was eventually dubbed as Nizi Project, a survival documentary series featuring 20 contestants was aired weekly on Hulu Japan from January 31 to June 26, 2020, and distributed internationally through JYP's official YouTube channel. On the final episode of Nizi Project, the finalized line-up for the new girl group, which was given the name NiziU, was revealed to the public. The group is announced to have partnered with Sony Music Japan for album sales and group management during its activities in Japan. NiziU made their official Japanese debut on December 2, 2020. On March 11, 2019, JYP reached a new partnership with Sony Music Entertainment's The Orchard. JYP will distribute both digital and physical releases to key markets in the US, Europe, and beyond through The Orchard in order to "expand the label's presence around the world." On June 8, 2019, it was announced that Fanling Culture Media (JYP China) trainee Yao Chen placed 5th in the finale of Produce Camp 2019 with 10,764,262 votes and has successfully made the final lineup of project group R1SE after participating in the survival show. The group made their debut on the same day. On June 17, JYP and Make-A-Wish Korea signed a memorandum of understanding (MOU) to help support children's wishes under JYP's "Every Dream Matters!" (EDM) campaign as part of their corporate social responsibility. Under the agreement, JYP will be carrying out various social responsibility activities with its artists, employees, and fans in order to support campaigns and initiatives for children with incurable diseases. On July 24, 2019, JYP announced they will be closing their acting division and some of their actors will be moving to Npio Entertainment, a start-up company created by JYP Vice President Pyo Jong-rok. With their announcement, JYP consequently revealed that their popular actors such as Jang Hee-ryung, Park Si-eun, and Ryu Won will not be staying on board with the new jointly managed label.

On January 6, 2020, Shinhan Card announced that it has collaborated with JYP to release a 'JYP Fan's EDM Check Card' (JYP Check Cards). Certain percentages of the amount used when making payments at JYP's domestic and international affiliates using the check cards are donated to Make-A-Wish Korea in line with the company's EDM campaign. The check cards are available in four types: JYP, Got7, Day6 and Twice. On February 24, it was announced that JYP entered into a "strategic partnership" with Republic Records, with Twice being signed under the label for American promotions. On August 4, 2020, JYP announced its collaboration with SM to establish Beyond LIVE Corporation (BLC), a joint company for virtual concerts. BLC was formed in order to develop the online concert series Beyond Live, with the goal of further growing the platform into an international online concerts brand. Later, in an interview with Forbes released on August 31, J.Y. Park shared that there are talks for a girl-group competition show based in America similar to that of Sixteen and Nizi Project. It was reported on November 17, 2020, that JYP Entertainment invested 5 billion KRW in Naver Z, the developer of the online avatar app Zepeto.

2021–present: Recent developments 
On January 10, 2021, it was reported that all the members of Got7 were leaving the company upon the completion of their 7-year contract. On April 26, 2021, it was reported that the company and Psy's P Nation would collaborate to form a new boy group each in Loud, which premiered on June 5 on SBS. Afterwards on July 12, JYP announced the second season of Nizi Project as a Global Boys Audition. On November 1, JYP announced their new rock band Xdinary Heroes, which released their debut digital single "Happy Death Day" on December 6. Then on January 26, 2022, JYP announced that they would be debuting a new girl group named Nmixx on February 22, with their debut single album, Ad Mare.

On February 10, 2022, JYP expanded their strategic partnership with Republic Records after Twice started to succeed in the United States. Following the announcement, Republic signed Stray Kids and Itzy under the label for American promotions. In April 2022, it was reported that the market cap of JYPE had soared from 1.33 trillion KRW in the previous year to 2.24 trillion KRW, an increase of 1 trillion KRW in the first three months of 2022. The Korea Exchange reported that the company's stock prices soared to 66,200 KRW on April 8, breaking its all-time record and marking the first time that JYP Entertainment has entered the 60,000 KRW range since its listing in August 2001. On July 12, 2022, all members of Twice renewed their contracts with JYP Entertainment. On September 26, 2022, all members of Day6 also renewed their contracts with the label.

Joint ventures

Music distribution 
JYP Entertainment's records are distributed worldwide by The Orchard since March 2019.

KMP Holdings and KT Music 

In March 2010, KMP Holdings was established via a joint venture between JYP, SM Entertainment, YG Entertainment, Star Empire, Media Line, CAN Entertainment, and Music Factory Entertainment. KMP Holdings was acquired by KT Music in November 2012, and in June 2013, KT Music absorbed KMP's distribution network. In January 2014, the seven talent agencies behind KMP Holdings formed a collective bond partnership and bought 13.48% of KT Music's stocks, leaving KT Corporation with 49.99%.

United Asia Management 
In 2011, JYP joined forces with SM, YG, KeyEast, AMENT, and Star J Entertainment to form United Asia Management in an effort to promote Korean pop music internationally.

FLO 
On January 31, 2018, Iriver announced its entry into the Korean music industry. Together with parent company SK Telecom and music labels SM, JYP and Big Hit Entertainment, the company launched a new online music store, FLO, in the second half of 2018.

Beijing Shinsung Entertainment 
On April 5, 2017, Ocean Music and JYP jointly established the Beijing Xin Sheng Entertainment Co., Ltd. for indoor recreational facilities operation, organization of cultural and artistic exchanges, film and television planning, and other aspects of cooperation. A few months later, Park Jin-young, Jackson Wang, Fei, and a 10-year-old JYP Chinese trainee went to China to record a roadshow-style audition show to recruit more trainees with the goal of creating a hip-hop oriented Chinese boy group. The name of the show was "Guaishushu Is Coming", and the concept was to travel across different cities with large-scale auditions and then have a final round to select the members who will be trained in Korea.

NCC Entertainment (NCC Station) 
NCC is a jointly produced management team by Tencent Music Corporation and JYP Beijing Cultural Exchange Ltd located in Beijing, China. Currently, it is working to promote its Chinese artists more despite the ban placed on Korean entertainment and to further promote Boy Story, a new Chinese boy group, in China.

Labels

Branches 

 JYP Beijing Cultural Exchange Ltd (JYPE China): The Chinese division of JYP, and the company's first official external branch in China. It was opened in 2008 and has two subsidiaries:
 Fanling Culture Media Ltd
 Beijing Shisung Ent. Ltd (joint venture with Tencent)
 (NCC) New Creative Culture
 JYP Entertainment USA Inc: The American division of JYP. It was established in 2008.
 JYP Entertainment Japan Inc: The Japanese division of JYP. It was established in 2009.
 JYP Entertainment Hong Kong Ltd: The Hong Kong division of JYP. It was established in 2017.

Divisions 
 JYP Publishing Corp: An affiliated company of JYP founded in February 2008 which houses record producers and songwriters under the label.
 JYP Foods Inc: JYP Foods Incorporated was founded in 2010. 
 Studio J Bar was created on June 2, 2016, as a collaboration between JYP and Y1975, a well-known bar in the Chungdam District.
 The Street is a brunch café owned by JYP. It has two branches: the main branch is located nearby the JYP Entertainment office building, and the other branch is located in the Gyeongridan area in Itaewon. The café is mostly used for interviews or meetings held by J.Y.Park and other artists under JYP.
 JYP Actors: The company's acting division which was founded in 2011 and was led by JYP vice-president Pyo Jong-rok. As of September 1, 2019, JYP Actors has become defunct with its actors moving into a new start-up company established by Pyo Jong-rok called Npio Entertainment.
 JYP Pictures: The company's film and TV drama production division that was founded in March 2011 along with other subsidiaries.
 JYP Pictures Co., Ltd Korea, established in 2013. It became defunct as of September 1, 2019
 JYP Pictures Co., Ltd China, established in 2014.

Subsidiaries/sub-labels 
 J. Tune Entertainment: A South Korean record label and entertainment company founded by former JYP artist Rain in November 2007, it was announced in December 2010 that JYP had become the largest shareholder of J. Tune Entertainment. In December 2013, J. Tune Entertainment was fully merged into JYP.
 Studio J: An in-house label established by J. Y. Park in January 2015 with the goal of putting focus on independent artists outside of the mainstream K-pop aesthetic. The singer G. Soul was revealed to be the first artist under Studio J. Currently, the subsidiary houses the rock bands, Day6 and Xdinary Heroes.
 SQU4D: A division of JYP Entertainment, it is the latter's fourth (hence the number "4" in its name) artist management label. Led by Lee Ji-young (the first woman to head a JYP Entertainment artist management division since its foundation), it currently houses Nmixx.

Philanthropy 
On March 18, 2011, JYP donated US$300,000 for Japanese disaster relief. On October 24, 2011, JYP Entertainment and 2PM donated US$130,000 for flood victims in Thailand.

During the COVID-19 pandemic, JYP donated US$410,000 to the Community Chest of Korea on February 28, 2020.

On March 8, 2022, JYP made a donation  millions to the Hope Bridge Disaster Relief Association to help the victims of the massive wildfire that started in Uljin, Gyeongbuk and has spread to Samcheok, Gangwon.

On February 12, 2023, JYP donated 500 million won to help 2023 Turkey–Syria earthquake, by donating money through World Vision.

Artists 

All artists under JYP Entertainment are collectively known as JYP Nation.

Korea

Recording artists 

Groups
 2PM
 Twice 
 Stray Kids
 Itzy 

 JYP Loud

Soloists
 J. Y. Park 
 Jang Woo-young
 Jun. K
 Lee Jun-ho
 Nichkhun
 Nayeon

Independent artists 

Studio J

Bands
 Day6
 Xdinary Heroes
Sub-units
 Day6 (Even of Day)
Soloists
 Young K 
 Dowoon
 Wonpil

SQU4D

 Groups
 Nmixx

China 
New Creative Content Entertainment
Boy Story
Fanling Culture Media Ltd.
Yao Chen

Japan 
JYPE Japan Inc
NiziU (co-managed with Sony Music Japan)

JYP Publishing 

Producers
 J. Y. Park "The Asiansoul"
 Armadillo (Kim Keun-woo)
 Frants
 Hong Ji-sang
 Dr.JO
 Honey Pot 
Cho Hyun-kyung
Park Yong-woon
 Joohyo
 Toyo
 Woo Rhee (Rainstone)
 Tigersoul
 Garden
 Lee Hae-sol
 Kim Mong-e
 Versachoi
 HotSauce 
Yang Jeong-sik
Lee Dal

 Kobee
 Jowul of Princess Disease
 Kim Seung-soo
 Woo Min Lee (collapsedone)
 Noday
 Paul Thompson (Marz)
 Ragoon IM
 Sim Eun-jee
 Song Ji-wook
 Raphael
 Tommy Park
Choreographers
 Jonte' Moaning
 Lia Kim
 Hyojin Lee-yong
 Park Nam-yong
 Tomoya Minase
 WooNg (Kim Hyung-woong)
 Kiel Tutin

Actors 

In July 2019, the agency announced changes to its actor management division, confirming that it would be jointly managing together with the new start-up company Npio Entertainment. It was decided that actors Yoon Park, Shin Eun-soo, Kang Hoon, Shin Ye-eun, Kim Dong-hee, and Lee Chan-sun are staying in the agency for the remainder of their contract periods. All other actors ended their contracts by mutual agreement.

Former artists

Former musicians 

 Pearl (1997–2000)
 g.o.d (2003–2005) 
 Kim Tae-woo (1998–2006)
 Son Ho-young (2003–2006)
 Joon Park (2003–2006)
 Park Ji-yoon (2000–2003)
 Noel (2002–2007)
 Rain (2002–2007)
 Byul (2002–2006)
 Lim Jeong-hee (2005–2012)
 Wonder Girls (2007–2017)
 Hyuna (2006–2008)
 Sohee (2006–2013)
 Sunye (2006–2015)
 Sunmi (2006–2017)
 Yeeun (2006–2017)
 Yubin (2007–2020)
 Hyerim (2010–2020)
 2PM
 Jay Park (2008–2010)
 Ok Taec-yeon (2008–2017)
 Hwang Chan-sung (2008–2022)
 2AM (2008–2010, 2014–2017)
 Lee Chang-min (2008–2010, 2014–2015)
 Jeong Jinwoon (2008–2010, 2014–2015)
 Lim Seul-ong (2008–2010, 2014–2015)
 Jo Kwon (2008–2010, 2014–2017)
 Joo (2008–2015)
 San E (2010–2013)
 Miss A (2010–2017)
 Jia (2010–2016)
 Min (2010–2017)
 Fei (2010–2018)
 Suzy (2010–2019)
 15& (2012–2019)
Park Jimin (2012–2019)
 Baek Yerin (2012–2019)
 Baek A Yeon (2012–2019)
 JJ Project (2012–2021)
 Got7 (2014–2021)
 Mark (2014–2021)
 JB (2012–2021)
 Jackson (2014–2021)
 Jinyoung (2012–2021)
 Youngjae (2014–2021)
 BamBam (2014–2021)
 Yugyeom (2014–2021)
 G.Soul (2015–2017)
 Day6
 Jae (2015–2021) 
 Im Jun-hyeok (2015–2016)
 Jeon Somi (2014–2018)
 Stray Kids
 Woojin (2017–2019)
 Jus2 (2019–2021)
 Bernard Park (2014–2022)
 NMIXX
 Jinni (2022)

Former actors and actresses 

 Cho Yi-hyun (2018–2019)
 Choi Woo-shik (2012–2018)
 Jang Dong-ju
 Jang Hee-ryung
 Jung Gun-joo
 Kang Yoon-je
 Kim Ha-eun (2007–2008)
 Kim Ji-min
 Kim Jong-mun
 Kim Ye-won (2015–2018)
 Kim Yu-an
 Lee Gi-hyuk
 Lee Ji-hyun
 Lee Jung-jin (2012–2016)
 Min Hyo-rin (2014–2017)
 Nam Sung-jun
 Park Gyu-young (2015–2019)
 Park Ji-bin (2015–2017)
 Park Joo-hyung
 Park Si-eun (2017–2019)
 Ryu Won
 Song Ha-yoon (2013–2019)
 Wei Daxun (2014–2017)
 Yeon Jung-hoon (2011)

Discography

Concerts 
 JYP Nation 2010 "Team Play"
December 24, 2010: Seoul (Olympic Gymnastics Arena)
 JYP Nation 2011
August 17–18, 2011: Saitama (Saitama Super Arena)
 JYP Nation 2012
August 4, 2012: Seoul (Olympic Gymnastics Arena) 
August 18–19, 2012: Tokyo (Yoyogi National Gymnasium)
 JYP Nation 2014 "One Mic"
August 9–10, 2014: Seoul (Jamsil Gymnasium)
August 30, 2014: Hong Kong (AsiaWorld-Expo)
September 5–7, 2014: Tokyo (Yoyogi National Gymnasium)
December 13, 2014: Bangkok (Impact Arena, Muang Thong Thani)
 JYP Nation 2016 "Mix & Match"
August 6, 2016: Seoul (Jamsil Gymnasium)
September 2–4, 2016: Tokyo (Yoyogi National Gymnasium)

Filmography

Film 
 2015: I Wanna Hold Your Hand
 2019: Homme Fatale

Television 
 2011: KBS2 Dream High
 2012: KBS2 Dream High 2
 2017: JTBC The Package
 2018: JTBC The Third Charm
 2019: JTBC Chocolate

Web drama 
 2015: Dream Knight
 2016: Touching You
 2016: Romantic Boss
 2017: Magic School

Programs 
 2006: MTV Wonder Girls (creation of Wonder Girls) 
 2008: Hot Blood Men (creation of One Day, further split into 2PM and 2AM)
 2012: MTV Diary  (reality show for JJ Project) 
 2014: Real GOT7 (reality show for Got7) 
 2015: Sixteen (creation of Twice)
 2017: Stray Kids (creation of Stray Kids)
 2019: Super Intern (creation of full-time JYP Entertainment employees)
 2020: Nizi Project (creation of NiziU)
 2021: Loud (creation of new boy group)

Notes

References

External links 

  

 
Companies based in Seoul
Companies listed on KOSDAQ
Contemporary R&B record labels
Electronic dance music record labels
Hip hop record labels
Music publishing companies of South Korea
K-pop record labels
Publishing companies established in 1997
Record labels established in 1997
South Korean brands
South Korean record labels
Sony Music
Synth-pop record labels
Talent agencies of South Korea
South Korean companies established in 1997